Aurangabad Assembly constituency was an assembly constituency in Murshidabad district in the Indian state of West Bengal.

Overview
As a consequence of the orders of the Delimitation Commission, Aurangabad Assembly constituency ceases to exist from 2011.  There are two new constituencies in the area – Samserganj Assembly constituency and Raghunathganj Assembly constituency.

It was part of Jangipur (Lok Sabha constituency).

Members of Legislative Assembly

Election results

1977–2006
In the 2006 state assembly elections, Touab Ali of CPI(M) won the 51 Aurangabad assembly seat defeating his nearest rival Humayun Reza of Congress. Humayun Reza of Congress defeated Nur Mohammad of CPI(M) in 2001 and Touab Ali of CPI(M) in 1996. Touab Ali of CPI(M) defeated Humayun Reza of Congress in 1991 and 1987.Lutfal Haque of Congress defeated Touab Ali of CPI(M) in 1982 and Sohidul Alam of CPI(M) in 1977. The Auragabad constituency did not exist prior to that.

References

Former assembly constituencies of West Bengal
Politics of Murshidabad district